Pyotr Nikolayevich Aksyonov (25 August 1946 – 4 November 2022) was a Russian engineer and politician. He served as prefect of the South-Western Administrative Okrug from 1993 to 2000 and of the Southern Administrative Okrug from 2000 to 2002.

Aksyonov died in Moscow on 4 November 2022, at the age of 76.

References

1946 births
2022 deaths
Russian engineers
Russian politicians
People from Lipetsk Oblast
Recipients of the Order "For Merit to the Fatherland", 4th class
Recipients of the Order of Friendship of Peoples
Recipients of the Order of Honour (Russia)